Foster Sylvers is the debut album by Foster Sylvers from the R&B group The Sylvers. Released in 1973, it was produced by Jerry Peters and Keg Johnson.

Track listing
"Misdemeanor" (Leon Sylvers III)
"Big Things Come in Small Packages" (Leon Sylvers III)
"I'm Your Puppet" (Dan Penn, Spooner Oldham)
"Mockingbird" (Charlie Foxx, Inez Foxx)
"I'll Get You In The End" (Leon Sylvers III)
"Hey Little Girl"
"Happy Face"
"Swooperman"
"More Love"
"Only My Love Is True"
"Lullabye / Uncle Albert"

Charts

Samples
"Misdemeanor"
"It's Funky Enough"" by The D.O.C. on his No One Can Do It Better album and "Tear The Roof Off" by Grandmaster Flash on his album Ba-Dop-Boom-Bang.
"More Love"
"No Brain"" by Madvillain on their Madvillainy 2: The Madlib Remix album
“out of sight” by Run The Jewels

References

External links
 Foster Sylvers – Foster Sylvers (1973) at Discogs

1973 debut albums
Foster Sylvers albums
Albums produced by Jerry Peters
MGM Records albums